The 2016 Asian Dragon Boat Championships was hosted from November 11–12, 2016 in Puerto Princesa, Palawan and was organized by the Philippine Canoe-Kayak Federation.

The 2016 edition marked the first time the Philippines hosted the continental tournament.

Events
Events in 4 categories will be held in two days.

Participants
10 nations entered the tournament but four nations (Brunei, India, Iran, Singapore) did not compete in a single event leaving six nations as participants.

 Philippines (hosts)

Results

Junior Mixed

Small Boat 500 meters

Small Boat 200 meters

Men

Standard Boat

500 meters

200 meters

Heats

Final

Source:

Small Boat

500 meters

Heats

Final

Source:

200 meters

Heats

Final

Source:

Women

Small Boat 500 meters

Small Boat 200 meters

Medal table

References

2016 in Philippine sport
Sports in Palawan
Dragon boat racing in the Philippines
Dragon boat
November 2016 sports events in the Philippines